Rancho Las Cruces Airstrip or Club Las Cruces Airstrip  is the private-use dirt airstrip at "Rancho Las Cruces" Resort, located in Las Cruces, Municipality of La Paz, Baja California Sur, Mexico, an isolated resort located just on the Gulf of California coast.  Interested parties may land for lunch and tour the resort.  The hotel has recently decided to accept new members.

External links
Aerial photo 1.
Aerial photo 2.

Airports in Baja California Sur
La Paz Municipality (Baja California Sur)